The School of Music in Piteå is a music school located in Piteå in northern Sweden. It is a part of the Department of Music and Media at Luleå University of Technology.

The school was founded in 1978. Well known professors at the school include composer Jan Sandström and organist Hans-Ola Ericsson.

External links
The School of Music in Piteå - Official site
Luleå University of Technology - Official site

References 

Music schools in Sweden
Piteå
Luleå University of Technology